Didacus Jules is the Director General of the Organization of Eastern Caribbean States.

Born in St. Lucia, Jules is known as a radical educator.  He was influenced by the work of Paulo Freire and his early work included pioneering literacy work in the Prisons in St. Lucia (Eastern Caribbean).  He was a principal actor in the National Literacy Campaign in Grenada during the revolution of 1979.  He later served simultaneously as Chief Education Officer and Permanent Secretary for Education, Youth, Culture, Women & Social Affairs in Grenada.  He serves on the International Journal of African and African American Studies Editorial Group.

Following the demise of the revolution, he served as an education consultant helping to establish mass literacy programs in St. Lucia, Dominica, St. Vincent and other parts of the Caribbean. He worked internationally with multilateral agencies such as CIDA, the World Bank, SIDA and assisted the African National Congress in developing adult education programs for its cadres.

Jules served as Permanent Secretary for Education & Human Resource Development in the Ministry of Education, HRD, Youth & Sports in St. Lucia from 1997-2004.  He holds a BA (hons) in English from the University of the West Indies in Barbados, an MSc in Curriculum & Instruction from the University of Wisconsin–Madison, an MBA from the University of the West Indies in Barbados and a PhD in Curriculum & Instruction and Education Policy from UW–Madison.

He has written extensively on critical education, education policy, and public sector reform.

References

Saint Lucian educators
Year of birth missing (living people)
Living people
University of Wisconsin–Madison School of Education alumni